Tirla is a village in Dhar district in the state of Madhya Pradesh, central India. It is located about 6 km west of Dhar.

References

External links and Sources 
 Imperial Gazetter on Dictionary of Southern Asia - Bhopawar Agency

Villages in Dhar district